John S. Thompson can refer to:
John Sparrow David Thompson, Canadian lawyer, judge, and politician
Jocko Thompson, born John Samuel Thompson, Major League Baseball pitcher
John S. Thompsonbrug, the John S. Thompson Bridge in Grave, the Netherlands, named after him